Stefan Nimke (born 1 March 1978 in Hagenow, Bezirk Schwerin) is an Olympic and world champion track cyclist from Germany.

At the 2000 Summer Olympics, he won the silver medal in the men's 1 km time trial, and was part of the German men's team that finished 7th in the men's team sprint.

At the 2004 Summer Olympics, he won the gold medal in the men's team sprint with Jens Fiedler and René Wolff, and won the bronze medal in the men's 1 km time trial.

At the 2008 Summer Olympics, he won the bronze medal in the men's team sprint, with Rene Enders and Maximillan Levy and finished in 9th place in the men's individual sprint.

See also
 Cycling at the 2004 Summer Olympics
 Cycling at the 2000 Summer Olympics

References

External links
  
 
 

1978 births
Living people
People from Hagenow
People from Bezirk Schwerin
German track cyclists
German male cyclists
Cyclists from Mecklenburg-Western Pomerania
Olympic cyclists of Germany
Cyclists at the 2000 Summer Olympics
Cyclists at the 2004 Summer Olympics
Cyclists at the 2008 Summer Olympics
Olympic gold medalists for Germany
Olympic silver medalists for Germany
Olympic bronze medalists for Germany
UCI Track Cycling World Champions (men)
Olympic medalists in cycling
Medalists at the 2000 Summer Olympics
Medalists at the 2004 Summer Olympics
Medalists at the 2008 Summer Olympics
Recipients of the Silver Laurel Leaf